Michel Wintacq (born 2 October 1955) is a Belgian former footballer who played as a defender. Following his retirement, Wintacq has had roles as a football coach.

During his club career, Wintacq played for RAA La Louviére, RFC de Liège and Standard Liège. He played once for the Belgium national team.

After retirement, he took interim positions at Mons and was trainer at Boussu Dour, before joining Tournai in 2011.

References

1955 births
Living people
Belgian footballers
Belgium international footballers
Association football defenders
RFC Liège players
Standard Liège players